Song Lam Nghe An Football Club, simply known as Song Lam Nghe An or  SLNA, is a professional V.League 1 football club playing at the Vinh Stadium in the city of Vinh, Nghe An province, Vietnam. The club was named based on the Lam river.

With 10 major titles totally, SLNA is the one of the most successful football club in Vietnam. In the international arena, the team performed well at the AFC Champions League in 2001. In the 2009–10 and 2010–11 seasons, under the direction of the head coach, Nguyễn Hữu Thắng, Song Lam Nghe An achieved all three titles: the V.League 1 championship, Vietnamese Cup, and the Vietnamese Super Cup.

The club's current president is Truong Sy Ba.

History

Prior to the start of the 2022 V.League 1 season, ownership of the club was transferred to the Tan Long Group. The change in ownership came with a logo rebrand and a new practice facility being built.

Honours

National competitions
League
 V.League 1:
 Winners :       1999–2000, 2000–01, 2011
 Runners-up :  2001–02, 1998
Cup
 Vietnamese Cup:
 Winners : 2002, 2010, 2017
 Runners-up : 2011
 Vietnamese Super Cup:
 Winners :      2000, 2001, 2002, 2011
 Runners-up : 2010, 2018

Performance in AFC competitions
 Asian Club Championship: 2 appearances
2000–01: First round
2001–02: withdrew in First round

 AFC Cup: 3 appearances
2011: Round of 16
2012: Group stage
2018: Group stage

1 Sông Lam Nghệ An withdrew.

Record as V.League member

Players and staff

Current squad

Out on loan

Coaching staff

Head coach history

Kit suppliers and shirt sponsors

Asian clubs ranking

References

External links
Official site

Association football clubs established in 1979
Football clubs in Vietnam
1979 establishments in Vietnam
Song Lam Nghe An FC